Nowhere is an unincorporated community in Caddo County, Oklahoma, United States.

Nowhere is at the intersection of E1280 Road and County Street 2550.

References

Unincorporated communities in Caddo County, Oklahoma
Unincorporated communities in Oklahoma